Stan Harrison (born December 8, 1953) is an American saxophonist who is also accomplished in playing other woodwind instruments, namely the horn, flute and clarinet. He has also written music for television. Harrison released his first solo album  The Ties That Blind in 2000 on his own record label. In 2007 he released The Optimist, an album which was produced by G TOM MAC, on the EdgeArtists record label.

The following are some of the many prominent artists with whom Harrison has played and/or recorded:
 Bruce Springsteen
 Southside Johnny
 Diana Ross
 Lee Palmer
 Little Steven
 Serge Gainsbourg
 David Bowie
 Radiohead
 Duran Duran
 Jonathan Coulton
 Stevie Ray Vaughan
 Mick Jagger
 Talking Heads
 They Might Be Giants 
 Najma Akhtar
 Gary Private
 Jewel

Discography
The Ties That Blind (2000)
The Optimist (2007)

External links

[ Stan Harrison credits at Allmusic]
Stan Harrison at EdgeArtists

1953 births
Living people
American male saxophonists
American multi-instrumentalists
American male composers
21st-century American composers
Southside Johnny & The Asbury Jukes members
American session musicians
Jersey Shore musicians
21st-century American saxophonists
The Miami Horns members